In Toga Candida is a speech given by Cicero during his election campaign in 64 BC for the consulship of 63 BC. The speech was directed at his competitors, Catilina and Antonius, who were also running for consulship for the same year. The speech no longer survives, though a commentary on it written by Asconius does survive.

The speech is called Oratio in Toga Candida since candidates wore specially whitened (Latin candida) togas, origin of the word candidate. Cicero used his election campaign speech to denounce his rivals and hint at secret powers behind Catiline. The tactics were successful and he secured the consulship.

References

External links
 The 'First' Catilinarian Conspiracy: A further re-examination of the evidence
 Fragments of the speech and more information

Catiline
Orations of Cicero